La Marea is one of 24 parishes (administrative divisions) in Piloña, a municipality within the province and autonomous community of Asturias, in northern Spain.

The population is 55 (INE 2011).

Villages and hamlets
 Fresnedal 
 La Marea  
 La Comba 
 Los Cuetos 
 Las Cuevas (Les Cueves) 
 Puente Miera 
 El Retorno

References

Parishes in Piloña